Senator Pace may refer to:

Lorin N. Pace (born 1925), Utah State Senate
Stephen Pace (1891–1970), Georgia State Senate
Tyler Pace (fl. 2010s), Arizona State Senate